The Representative Music Band of the Mexican Armed Forces (Banda Representativa de Música de las Fuerzas Armadas Mexicanas in Spanish) is a Mexican military band which is currently led by Agripino Centeno Blanco, who serves as bandleader and director of music. As the more senior band of the Mexican Armed Forces personnel are qualified musicians from all branches of the Armed Forces, and thus the band is under the command of both the Secretariat of National Defense and the Secretariat of the Navy.

Band History

The history of the band began in 1889 when, at the initiative of the President Porfirio Díaz, the Music Band of the Supreme Power was founded. It changed its name several times in the over 80 years that followed while being the foremost military band of the armed forces. The band was renamed in 1973 to the Representative Music Band of the Mexican Armed Forces. From then on it accompanied the Mexican Presidential Guard (EMP) in important state ceremonies and events and has played in the CDMX, venues all over Mexico as well as in overseas festivals. On 20 February 2015, the band was reorganized to be truly representative of the Mexican Armed Forces by inserting personnel from the military bands of the Secretariats of the Mexican Army, Mexican Air Force and the Mexican Navy.

During the summer of that year, the newly reorganized musical group participated military tattoos and festivals in Europe, such as the Saumur Military Festival in France and in the Spasskaya Tower Military Music Festival and Tattoo in Russia. In 2010, Army Music performed extensively across the country, celebrating the bicentennial of the Mexican Independence and the centenary of the Mexican Revolution.

The band director, Agripino Centeno Blanco, has stated that the Mexican band's participation in military festivals around the world helps spread Mexican musical traditions abroad and gives the musicians a chance to exchange experiences with other foreign military bands.

See also
 Bugle and trumpet calls of the Mexican Armed Forces
Cuban Revolutionary Armed Forces Military Bands Department
Musical Unit of the Spanish Royal Guard

Videos

 Banda de Música de las Fuerzas Armadas Mexicanas en el "Festival de Música Militar Saumur, Francia".
 Banda de música representativa de las Fuerzas Armadas Mexicanas.

References

Mexican military bands
Mexican music
Military of Mexico
Military units and formations established in 1889
1889 establishments in Mexico